Zarko Jukić (born 28 July 1993) is a Danish professional basketball player and a member of the Danish national team.

Club career
Jukić started his career in Denmark with the Hørsholm 79ers in 2011 and played there until 2014. The following two seasons he played in Sweden, first with KFUM Nässjö and then with the Norrköping Dolphins. During the 2016-17 season, he played for Ourense in the Spanish second-tier LEB Oro. The next three seasons he played for the Newcastle Eagles, Albacete Basket and Team FOG Næstved.

On 20 February 2021, Jukić signed with reigning Icelandic champions KR.

National team career
Jukić plays for the Danish national team.

References

External links
Profile on fiba.com
Profile on eurobasket.com
Profile on realgm.com
Profile on Proballers.com
Swedish statistics

1993 births
Living people
Club Ourense Baloncesto players
Danish men's basketball players
Danish people of Yugoslav descent
Hørsholm 79ers players
KR men's basketball players
Newcastle Eagles players
Norrköping Dolphins players
Small forwards
Úrvalsdeild karla (basketball) players
Albacete Basket players
Sportspeople from Copenhagen